Mario Da Pozzo (born 9 July 1939 in Legnago, Province of Verona) is an Italian former football goalkeeper.

Career
Throughout his career, Da Pozzo played for Inter (1958–59; 1960–61), Catanzaro (1959–60), Genoa (1961–65), Varese (1965–69), Mantova (1969–73), and Napoli (1973–74). He made his debut in Serie A with Inter, on 2 June 1959, in a 1–1 away draw against Alessandria. During his time with Genoa, he won a Serie B title, and the Coppa delle Alpi twice; he also established what was, at the time, the record for the most minutes without conceding in Serie A, during the 1963–64 season, going unbeaten for 791 minutes. He held the record until it was broken by Juventus's Dino Zoff, during the 1972–73 season. Currently, his unbeaten streak is the fourth best in Serie A history. With Mantova, he won another Serie B title during the 1970–71 season, also setting a record for the most minutes without conceding a goal in the Italian second division during the same season, with an 878-minute unbeaten streak.

Honours
Genoa
Serie B: 1961–62
Coppa delle Alpi: 1962, 1964

Mantova 
Serie B: 1970–71

References

1939 births
Living people
People from Legnago
Italian footballers
Association football goalkeepers
Inter Milan players
U.S. Catanzaro 1929 players
Genoa C.F.C. players
Mantova 1911 players
S.S.C. Napoli players
Serie A players
Sportspeople from the Province of Verona
Footballers from Veneto